Raymond D. Telford (born 23 November 1946) is a Canadian former soccer player who competed at the 1976 Summer Olympics. He also represented Canada at the 1971 and 1975 Pan American Games. He moved to Nanaimo, British Columbia from England when he was eighteen years old.

References

External links
 
 

1946 births
Living people
Footballers from Newcastle upon Tyne
Canadian soccer players
Olympic soccer players of Canada
Footballers at the 1976 Summer Olympics
Footballers at the 1971 Pan American Games
Footballers at the 1975 Pan American Games
Pan American Games competitors for Canada
Sportspeople from Nanaimo
Soccer people from British Columbia
English emigrants to Canada
Naturalized citizens of Canada
Association football defenders
Canada men's international soccer players